Geny may refer to:

GenY, or Generation Y, demographic cohort following Generation X
Francois Geny (1861–1959), French jurist